Olaf Bach (1892–1963) was a German film actor.

Selected filmography
 William Tell (1934)
 Trouble with Jolanthe (1934)
 Stjenka Rasin (1936)
 Shadows Over St. Pauli (1938)
 Women for Golden Hill (1938)
 The Impossible Mister Pitt (1938)
 The Indian Tomb (1938)
 The Star of Rio (1940)
 Back Then (1943)

References

Bibliography
 Goble, Alan. The Complete Index to Literary Sources in Film. Walter de Gruyter, 1999.

External links

1892 births
1963 deaths
German male film actors
German male stage actors
Male actors from Hamburg
20th-century German male actors